Valentinian may refer to:
 Valentinian I or Valentinian the Great (321–375), Western Roman emperor from 364 to 375
 Valentinian II (371–392), Western Roman Emperor from 375 to 392
 Valentinian III (419–455), Western Roman Emperor from 425 to 455
 Valentinus (Gnostic) or Valentinian (died 150s), gnostic theologian and founder of Valentinianism
 Valentinian (play), a Jacobean-era stage play
 Valentinianic dynasty, an Imperial Roman dynasty founded by Valentinian I and sometimes known as the Valentinian dynasty

See also
Valentine (disambiguation), an Anglicization of Valentinian, Valentinus, and Valentinius
Valentinianism, a Gnostic movement founded by Valentinus
Valentinus (disambiguation)